George Milo (December 12, 1909 – August 19, 1984) was an American set decorator. He was nominated for three Academy Awards in the category Best Art Direction.

Selected filmography
Milo was nominated for three Academy Awards for Best Art Direction:
 Psycho (1960)
 Judgment at Nuremberg (1961)
 That Touch of Mink (1962)

References

External links

1909 births
1984 deaths
American set decorators